William Gwyn (11 April 1736 in Prescot – 19 August 1770 in Brighton) was an Oxford college head.

Gwyn was educated at Brasenose College, Oxford. He held the livings at Cottingham, Northamptonshire; and was Principal of Brasenose from his election on 10 May 1770 until his death four months later.

Notes

 

18th-century English Anglican priests
Alumni of Brasenose College, Oxford
Principals of Brasenose College, Oxford
1770 deaths
People from Lancashire (before 1974)